Photo Face-Off is a competitive photography reality TV show pinning amateur photographers across Southeast Asia against each other and resident professional photographer Justin Mott. Presented by Canon Photomarathon Asia, it premiered in 2014 on History channel.

The show is into its fourth season, which premiered in September 2017. Justin Mott will continue to be the resident professional photographer and judge.

References

Weblinks
Official page of Photo Face-Off on History Asia

Photography
2010s reality television series
A&E Networks
Photography events